De Película is a 24-hour cable television movie channel owned by TelevisaUnivision under Televisa Networks. It is available in Mexico, the United States, and Latin America. This channel focuses on Mexican movies of all times that are under license of TelevisaUnivision.

External links
 Official site 

Latin American cable television networks
Televisa pay television networks
Movie channels in Mexico
1990 establishments in Mexico